Avrocar are an electronica band from Birmingham, England. Band member Antony Harding has another more folk-oriented project called July Skies.

Discography
 Cinematography 
 Live at Ochre 7
 Guidance 
 Against the Dying of the Light
 "Summer Blonde"

References

English electronic music groups
Musical groups from Birmingham, West Midlands